NIHL may refer to:
 Noise-induced hearing loss
 National Ice Hockey League (disambiguation)